Kaytazdere is a small belde (town) in Altınova district of Yalova Province, Turkey. At  it is  almost merged to Altınova. The population of Kaytazdereis  is 5278 as of 2010. The settlement was founded at the end of the second Balkan War by Turkish refugees from Bulgaria. After the second World War an airbase was established around Kaytazdere. The economy of the town depends on small industries and agriculture.

References

Populated places in Yalova Province
Towns in Turkey
Populated places in Altınova District